Nasir Pemberton known professionally as Digital Nas or DN, is a Grammy-nominated American record producer, singer & songwriter. He initially began producing for underground artists and later rose to prominence for his work with Kanye West on his tenth studio album Donda which charted number 1 on the Billboard 200.

Early life and career
Nasir Pemberton was born in Atlanta, Georgia. Getting involved with music early as a kid throughout high school, he discovered his desire to produce music. As he continued to hone his production skills, he produced beats for artists involved in the underground music scene of Atlanta at the time which later went on to become major acts such as Trippie Redd, Playboi Carti & Lil Yachty. With his quick rise to internet fame, Nas expanded working with many other major artists such as ASAP Rocky, Kanye West & many other acts among others. Aside from music, Nas is a heavily involved skateboarder, and it is still one of his favorite hobbies today.

In January 2016, he formed his own record label, III Records.

Nas has also frequently collaborated with fellow Atlanta-based artist Bktherula, executive producing and featuring on her 2020 mixtape Nirvana.

Musical style and influences
Nas is widely known for his effort in breaking into the genre "mumble rap" through the online audio distribution platform SoundCloud. Nas has cited several prominent artists as influencing his musical style, including Pharrell Williams, Eazy E, Sid Vicious, and Morrissey. Additionally, his soft spot for shoegaze and punk rock bands, such as his favorite band Germs, are sources of inspiration.

Discography

Extended plays
 DN (2016)
 Throwaway Songs Worth Listening To (2019)
 DN 2.9 (2022)

Mixtapes
  DN 2 (2019)

Singles 

No Safety (2019)

Production discography

Studio albums
 Lil Boat – Lil Yachty (2016)
 Teenage Emotions – Lil Yachty (2017)
 Still Striving – A$AP Ferg (2017)
 A Love Letter to You 2 – Trippie Redd (2017)
 Bawskee – Comethazine (2018)
 Lil Boat 2 – Lil Yachty (2018)
 Nuthin' 2 Prove – Lil Yachty (2018)
 Mudboy – Sheck Wes (2018)
 Nirvana - Bktherula (2020) 
 Love Black - Bktherula (2021) 
 Donda - Kanye West (2021)
 Pink is Better - Token (2022)
 Crunkstar - Duke Deuce (2022)
 Donda 2 - Kanye West (2022)

Mixtapes
 Go Home – Chris Travis (2014)
 Project X – Xavier Wulf (2015)
 Wopavelli 2 – Lil Wop (2017) 
 Wopavelli 3 – Lil Wop (2017)
 Wopavelli 4 – Lil Wop (2018)

Extended plays
 The Lost Files – Digital Nas & Lil Yachty (2016)
 The Lost Files 2 – Digital Nas & Lil Yachty (2019)

Singles
"Southside" - Xavier Wulf FKA "Ethelwulf" featuring Chris Travis (2013)
"Lil Boat" - Lil Yachty (2015)
"Run It" - Playboi Carti featuring Lil Yachty (2015)
"93" - Duwap Kaine (2017)
"Mattress Remix" - ASAP Ferg featuring ASAP Rocky, Playboi Carti, Rich the Kid and Famous Dex (2017)
"NBAYoungBoat" – Lil Yachty featuring YoungBoy Never Broke Again (2018)
"Bring The Block Outside" – 03 Greedo (2019)
"She's Foreign" – 03 Greedo (2019)
"Security" – Kanye West (2022)

Charts and certifications

Weekly charts

Year-end charts

References

1998 births
Living people
Rappers from Atlanta
Rappers from Georgia (U.S. state)
21st-century American rappers
21st-century American male singers
21st-century American singers
African-American male rappers
21st-century African-American male singers
American hip hop singers
Record producers from Georgia (U.S. state)